Lycée polyvalent Charles Petiet is a senior high school/sixth-form college in Villeneuve-la-Garenne, Hauts-de-Seine, France, in the Paris metropolitan area.

History
It was first established in 1943.

It celebrated its 70-year anniversary in 2013.

References

External links
 Lycée Charles Petiet 

Lycées in Hauts-de-Seine
1943 establishments in France
Educational institutions established in 1943